Sir Philip Musgrave, 8th Baronet (12 July 1794 – 16 July 1827) was an English baronet and politician.

He was a Member of Parliament (MP) for Petersfield from 1820 to 1825,
and for Carlisle from 1825 to 1827.

He succeeded to the baronetcy, of Hartley Castle, in 1806.

References

External links 
 

1794 births
1827 deaths
Baronets in the Baronetage of England
Members of the Parliament of the United Kingdom for English constituencies
UK MPs 1820–1826
UK MPs 1826–1830